Jeon Ji-hye (born July 25, 1984), better known by her stage name Lady Jane, is a South Korean singer, television personality, radio presenter.
 Her syndicated radio show Lady Jane at 2PM, airs via the KBS Cool FM since 2015.

Discography

Extended plays

Singles

As lead artist

As featured artist

Other Appearances

References

External links
 Twitter Official
 Instagram Official

1984 births
Living people
South Korean women pop singers
South Korean dance musicians
South Korean television presenters
South Korean women television presenters
South Korean radio presenters
Sookmyung Women's University alumni
People from Daegu
21st-century South Korean singers
21st-century South Korean women singers
South Korean women radio presenters